Marcos César Dias de Castro (born 27 August 1958), known as Marcos Paquetá, is a former Brazilian footballer who played as a central midfielder and a current manager.

Career
Born in Rio de Janeiro but raised in the Paquetá Island, he started his career at hometown side America's youth setup. In 1978 he moved to Vasco da Gama, and spent his first season with the under-20 squad before being promoted to the first team. He eventually retired in 1981, aged just 23.

Paquetá started his managerial career in 1987, while in charge of first club America. In the following year he moved abroad for the first time, taking over UAE Pro-League side Al-Shabbab. He left the club in 1989, and was subsequently appointed manager of Flamengo's youth setup.

In 1995, Paquetá was an interim manager of the first team for one match, after the arrival of Edinho. He remained as a youth team manager until 1998, and moved to Fluminense the following year, also in charge of the youth categories.

In 2001 Paquetá returned to Fla, and was again interim in 2003 after the dismissal of Nelsinho Baptista. Later in that year, he led the Brazil under-17 side to the title of the FIFA U-17 World Cup, and repeated the feat with the under-20s only months later.

Paquetá returned to Flamengo for the 2004 Copa São Paulo de Futebol Júnior, and was subsequently in charge of Avaí. On 17 December 2005, after impressing as manager of Al-Hilal, he was named manager of Saudi Arabia national team, being in charge of the side during the 2006 FIFA World Cup.

In 2007, after a short spell back at Al-Hilal, Paquetá signed with Qatar Stars League side Al-Gharafa, leading them to the league title twice and the Sheikh Jassem Cup. He was head coach of Al-Rayyan for a season, and in July 2010, he signed a two-year contract to become manager of the Libya national team.

In June 2012, Paquetá signed a contract to take over Al Shabab for a second time in his career. He left the club in 2014, and returned for a second spell as manager of Al-Gharafa on 7 June of that year, signing a two-year deal.

In December 2015, Paquetá signed a contract with Egyptian club Zamalek SC, but was sacked the following 3 January. In October 2017, he took over Iraqi side Al-Shorta.

On 31 May 2018, Paquetá was appointed manager of Indian Super League side FC Pune City, but terminated his contract less than a month later. On 26 June, he was presented as manager of Botafogo.

Paquetá was sacked from Bota on 1 August 2018, after losing four of his five games in charge.

On 23 September 2021, Paquetá was appointed manager of CR Belouizdad.On 26 June 2022, he left CR Belouizdad.

On 28 July 2022, Paquetá was appointed manager of Hassania Agadir.

Managerial statistics

References

External links

1958 births
Living people
Association football midfielders
Brazilian footballers
CR Vasco da Gama players
CR Flamengo managers
Fluminense FC managers
Brazilian football managers
2006 FIFA World Cup managers
Al Hilal SFC managers
Al-Gharafa SC managers
Al-Rayyan SC managers
zamalek SC managers
Expatriate football managers in the United Arab Emirates
Expatriate football managers in Saudi Arabia
Expatriate football managers in Qatar
Saudi Arabia national football team managers
2012 Africa Cup of Nations managers
Avaí FC managers
Libya national football team managers
America Football Club (RJ) managers
Botafogo de Futebol e Regatas managers
Al-Shorta SC managers
America Football Club (RJ) players
UAE Pro League managers
Brazilian expatriate sportspeople in the United Arab Emirates
Al-Muharraq SC managers
Footballers from Rio de Janeiro (city)
FC Pune City managers